Luke Edward Whitehead (born February 9, 1981) is a former professional basketball player. Born in Walnut Creek, California, he played forward for the University of Louisville.

College
After graduating from Oak Hill Academy in 2000, Whitehead joined University of Louisville where he played until 2004. During his career at U of L he accumulated more than 1,000 points and over 600 rebounds. In 2003 he was named the Conference USA Tournament MVP.

Accident during game
In a game against Coppin State on December 12, 2001, Whitehead was upended while making an alley-oop when he was undercut by Larry Tucker of Coppin State and landed on the side of his head. He was taken to the hospital to determine if there was any damage to his kidneys or spine.

Playing career
In 2004, he played in the NBA Summer League for the Golden State Warriors. Following the NBA Summer League, he played for the Kentucky Colonels.
In 2006, he was drafted in the NBA Development League's draft by the Sioux Falls Skyforce, but was later waived due to injury.

He played for Alba Berlin during the 2005–06 Basketball Bundesliga season where he won the 2006 German Basketball Cup.

In January 2008, Whitehead was signed by the Gold Coast Blaze of the Australian National Basketball League to replace Juaquin Hawkins, who had suffered a stroke.

References

External links
College statistics at sports-reference.com
Luke Whitehead at basketball-reference.com

1981 births
Living people
Alba Berlin players
American expatriate basketball people in Australia
American expatriate basketball people in Germany
American expatriate basketball people in South Korea
Basketball players from California
Gold Coast Blaze players
Goyang Carrot Jumpers players
Iowa Energy players
Louisville Cardinals men's basketball players
Sportspeople from Walnut Creek, California
Seoul SK Knights players
Sioux Falls Skyforce players
Small forwards
American men's basketball players